Dobro is a wood-bodied, single cone resonator guitar.

Dobro may also refer to:

 Dobro, a word meaning "Good" in most Slavic languages

People
 Carrie Dobro (born 1957), American actress

Places
 Dobro (Livno), a village in the municipality of Livno, Bosnia and Herzegovina
 Dobro Brdo, a village in the municipality of Donji Vakuf, Bosnia and Herzegovina
 short for Downtown Brooklyn

See also
 Dobra (disambiguation)
 Drobo, a computer data storage device
 Dobro Polje (disambiguation)